Tokhta (Toqta, Toktu, Tokhtai, Tochtu or Tokhtogha) (died ) was a khan of the Golden Horde, son of Mengu-Timur and great-grandson of Batu Khan.

His name "Tokhtokh" means "hold/holding" in the Mongolian language.

Early reign under Nogai 
In 1288, Tokhta was ousted by his cousins. In 1291, he reclaimed the throne with the help of Nogai Khan. Tokhta then gave the Crimea to Nogai as a gift. Nogai subsequently beheaded many of the Mongol nobles who were supporters of Tulabuga, thanks to his new supposed puppet khan.

Tokhta wanted to eliminate the Russian princes' semi-independence. To that effect, he had sent his brother Tudan to the Rus lands in 1293. Tudan's army would go on to devastate fourteen towns. Tokhta himself (known here as Tokhta-Temur) went to Tver, and forced Dmitry Alexandrovich, Nogai's ally, to abdicate. The Russians chroniclers depicted these events as "The harsh-time of Batu returns." Some sources have suggested that Tokhta and Nogai had worked together.

Soon afterwards, Tokhta and Nogai began a deadly rivalry.  The Khan's father-in-law Saljiday of the Khunggirads, his wife Bekhlemish, the granddaughter of Tolui, and other Chingisids in the Horde also complained about Nogai's contrariness to him. Nogai had refused to come to the court of the Khan. They also disagreed on trade rights of the Venetians and Genoese merchants as well.

Khan Tokhta's forces lost the first battle with Nogai in 1296–1297. Nogai did not bother to chase after him, and he decided instead to return to his lands. Tokhta asked the Ilkhan Ghazan for his assistance. The latter refused because he did not want to be mixed up with their quarrels. In 1300, Tokhta finally defeated Nogai at the battle of the Kagamlyk River, south-southwest of the city of Poltava, and united the lands from the Volga to the Don under his authority. Nogai's son Chaka had fled first to the land of the Alans, and then to Bulgaria, where he reigned as their Czar. This had enraged Tokhta so much so that soon after Chaka's brother-in-law Theodore Svetoslav participated in a plot to overthrow him. Chaka was found strangled and his head was sent to Khan Tokhta to show his (Theodore Svetoslav's) and the Bulgarian nobility their allegiance. Tokhta then divided Nogai's lands, which had stretched from the Crimea and the Russian principalities to modern Romania, among his brother Sareibugha and his sons.

Later reign 

While Tokhta was busy dealing with Nogai, Bayan Khan asked for his help against the rebels in the White Horde. Unfortunately, Tokhta was unable to send him any assistance. In 1301, Bayan was forced to flee to Tokhta. Tokhta then helped him to reassert his authority by attacking Kuruichik, who was backed by Qaidu. The forces of the Golden Horde then won the conflict with the Chagatai Khan Duwa and Qaidu's son Chapar.

After solidifying his control over the Russian Principalities and the Kipchak steppes, Tokhta demanded that the Ilkhan Ghazan give back the regions of Azerbaijan and the Arran. Ghazan refused his request and replied, "That land was conquered by our ancestors' Indian steel swords!" Tokhta then decided to restore the former alliance with the Mamluks of Egypt and sent them his envoys. During the reign of Oljeitu, the respective armies of the Golden Horde and the Ilkhanate engaged in small border conflicts, but this was not to last long.

In 1304, messengers from the Chagatai Khanate and the Yuan dynasty arrived in Sarai. They introduced their masters' plan and idea of peace. Tokhta accepted the nominal supremacy of the Yuan Emperor Temür Öljeytü (Chengzong), the grandson of Kublai Khan; at the same time Muhammad Khudabanda Öljeitü ruled Ilkhanid Persia, just ceding the lands of Arran to Toqta and Duwa retained nominal sovereignty in the Chagatai Khanate. The postal system and trade routes were also restored. The Golden Horde sent two tumens (20,000) to buttress the Yuan frontier.

Khan Tokhta arrested the Italian residents of Sarai, and besieged the city of Caffa in 1307. The cause behind this was apparently Tokhta's displeasure at the Italian trade in Turkic slaves who were mostly sold as soldiers to the Egyptian Mamluk Sultanate. The Genoese resisted for a year, but in 1308 set fire to their city and abandoned it. Relations between the Italians and the Golden Horde remained tense until 1312 when Tokhta died during preparations for a new military campaign against the Russian lands. Some sources claimed that he died without a male heir. But the Yuan shi and some Muslim sources stated that he had at least three sons  and one of them was murdered by Khan  Ozbeg's supporters.

Although he was Shamanist, he was interested in Buddhism. He was the last non-Muslim khan of Golden Horde.

In 1297, Khan Tokhta married Maria Palaiologina, the illegitimate daughter of the Byzantine Emperor, Andronikos II Palaiologos. Their daughter Marija later married Narimantas, the Grand Duke of Lithuania.

Genealogy
Genghis Khan
Jochi
Batu Khan
Toqoqan
Mengu-Timur
Toqta

Ancestry

See also
List of Khans of the Golden Horde

References

 

1270s births
1310s deaths
Year of birth uncertain
Year of death uncertain
Khans of the Golden Horde
13th-century monarchs in Europe
14th-century monarchs in Europe
Mongolian shamanism